The 1996 New Hampshire gubernatorial election took place on November 5, 1996. State Senator Jeanne Shaheen won the election, marking the first time since 1980 that a Democrat was elected Governor of New Hampshire. She defeated Ovide Lamontagne, who had defeated representative Bill Zeliff for the Republican nomination.

Election results

References

See also

New Hampshire
1996
Gubernatorial